The quinto real or the quinto del rey, the "king's fifth", was a 20% tax established in 1504 that Spain levied on the mining of precious metals. The tax was a major source of revenue for the Spanish monarchy. In 1723 the tax was reduced to 10%.

Rather than levy the tax on the basis of the amount of silver or gold produced, the government tracked the amount of mercury used.  Mercury was essential for the refinement of silver and gold in the patio process (see also amalgamation).  The Spanish government had a monopoly of mercury production, through its mines at Almadén in Spain and at Huancavelica in Peru.  In 1648 the Viceroy of Peru declared that Potosí and Huancavelica were "the two pillars that support this kingdom and that of Spain."  Moreover, the viceroy thought that Spain could, if necessary, dispense with the silver from Potosí, but it could not dispense with the mercury from Huancavelica.

Popular culture
The King's Fifth is a novel by Scott O'Dell in which the protagonist is accused of stealing the King's Fifth.

References

Spanish colonization of the Americas
Economic history of Mexico